Reebok International Limited is an American fitness footwear and clothing brand that is a part of Authentic Brands Group. It was established in England in 1958 as a companion company to J.W. Foster and Sons, a sporting goods company which had been founded in 1895 in Bolton, Lancashire. From 1958 until 1986, the brand featured the flag of the United Kingdom in its logo to signify the origins of the company. It was bought by German sporting goods company Adidas in 2005, then sold to the American Authentic Brands Group in 2021. The company's global headquarters are located in Boston, Massachusetts, in the Seaport District.

History

Early years
In 1895, Joseph William Foster at the age of 14 started work in his bedroom above his father's sweetshop in Bolton, England, and designed some of the earliest spiked running shoes. After his ideas progressed, he founded his business "J.W. Foster" in 1900; later he joined with his sons and changed the company name to J.W. Foster and Sons. Foster opened a small factory called Olympic Works, and gradually became famous among athletes for his "running pumps". The company began distributing its shoes across the United Kingdom, which were worn by British athletes. They were made famous by 100m Olympic champion Harold Abrahams in the 1924 Summer Olympics held in Paris.

In 1958, in Bolton, two of the founder's grandsons, Jeff and Joe Foster, formed a companion company "Reebok", having found the name in a dictionary won in a sprint race by Joe as a boy. The name is Afrikaans for the grey rhebok, a type of African antelope.

In 1979, an American businessman named Paul Fireman took notice of Reebok at the Chicago NSGA (National Sporting Goods of America) Show. Fireman had previously been an executive with his family business Boston Camping, and negotiated a deal to license and distribute the Reebok brand in the United States. The division became known as Reebok USA Ltd. That year, Fireman introduced three new shoes to the market at $60. By 1981, Reebok reached more than $1.5 million in sales.

1980s–1990s
In 1982, Reebok debuted the Reebok Freestyle aerobics shoe, the first athletic shoe designed for women. The following year Reebok's sales were $13 million, and Fireman bought the English-based parent company in 1984. Officially an American company in 1985, Reebok had its initial public offering on the New York Stock Exchange under the ticker symbol RBK and was renamed Reebok International Limited.

The brand established itself in professional tennis with the Newport Classic shoe, popularized by Boris Becker and John McEnroe, and the Revenge Plus, also known as the Club C. The company began expanding from tennis and aerobics shoes to running and basketball throughout the mid to late 1980s, the most significant segment of the athletic footwear industry. In 1986, Reebok switched its logo from the Union Jack it had since its founding, to the vector logo—an abstract Union Flag streak across a race track—which mirrored the design of the side flashes of its shoes. The switch signaled the transition of the company into a performance brand as it began licensing deals with professional athletes in the NBA and NFL.

Reebok also began developing sports clothing and accessories, entered the college/pro sports arena, and introduced a line of children's athletic shoes called Weeboks. It acquired Rockport for $118.5 million in 1986. By mid-decade, Reebok's sales were about $1 billion, and it overtook Nike, Inc. as the largest athletic shoe manufacturer in the US before losing the top position in 1988. One of the company's most iconic technologies, the Reebok Pump, debuted in 1989 with more than 100 professional athletes wearing the footwear by 1992, including Shaquille O'Neal.

Reebok worked with fitness professional Gin Miller in the late 1980s to develop Step Reebok, based on Miller's wooden prototype step and her ideas for step aerobics. The Step was evaluated in physiology trials undertaken by Drs. Lorna and Peter Francis at San Diego State University. In August 1989 the Step was ready, made in molded plastic by Sports Step of Atlanta with Reebok's name on it, and by March 1990, the step aerobics classes were attracting media attention. Miller promoted Step Reebok in person, touring the U.S. and demonstrating it at exercise studios. Step aerobics became widely popular, helping the company sell many thousands of adjustable-height step devices and millions of high-top shoes with ankle support. Step aerobics peaked in 1995 with 11.4 million people exercising in that style.

Reebok named Carl Yankowski president and chief executive officer of the brand in 1998, replacing former president Robert Meers. Yankowski stepped down one year later to accept an executive position at another company. Reebok chairman and CEO Paul Fireman took over as president for the first time in 12 years.

2000s

In 2001, Reebok hired Peter Arnell with the Arnell Group as its lead marketing agency, which created several advertising campaigns, including a successful series of Terry Tate commercials. The agency also helped develop the Yao Ming line, and the fashion-oriented Rbk brand. In December, Jay Margolis was named as Reebok's president and COO. After launching retail flagship stores in China, Dhaka, London, Los Angeles, New York, Philadelphia and Tokyo, Margolis resigned in October 2004. Fireman took over as president after signing a new long-term employment agreement with the Reebok board of directors.

Reebok acquired official National Hockey League sponsor CCM in 2004. The company began manufacturing ice hockey equipment under the CCM and Reebok brands. It phased out the CCM name on NHL authentic and replica jerseys, using the Reebok logo since 2005. CCM became Reebok-CCM Hockey in 2007. Reebok moved most of its hockey equipment lines to CCM after 2015.

Adidas ownership 
Following an intellectual property lawsuit in August 2005, Adidas acquired Reebok as a subsidiary, but maintained operations under their separate brand names. Adidas acquired all of the outstanding Reebok shares and completed the deal valued at $3.8 billion. Following the acquisition, Adidas replaced Reebok as the official uniform supplier for the NBA in 2006 with an 11-year deal that includes the WNBA, replica jerseys, and warm-up gear.

Reebok named Paul Harrington president and CEO of the company in January 2006, replacing Paul Fireman who was acting president since 2004. Harrington joined the company in 1994 and was Reebok's senior vice president of global operations and chief supply chain officer.

In 2010, Reebok announced a partnership with CrossFit, a fitness company and competitive fitness sport, including sponsoring the CrossFit Games, opening CrossFit studios, and introducing a line of co-branded footwear and apparel for Fall 2011. In 2011, Reebok debuted the CrossFit delta symbol on the brand's fitness apparel line. As it lost contracts to make sportswear for professional and college teams (its last uniform rights contract, with the NHL, ended in 2017), Reebok began repositioning itself as a fitness-oriented brand, just as it had been during the 1980s and early 1990s.

In 2013, Reebok announced another fitness partnership with Les Mills International. The agreement included Reebok footwear and clothing integration into Les Mills' fitness programs and media marketing. By July 2013, the red delta sign began appearing on Reebok's fitness collections. The brand announced it was phasing out the vector logo and replacing it with the delta sign, the company's second logo change in more than 120 years. The delta symbol is meant to symbolize three pillars of positive self-change—mental, physical and social—as Reebok increases its presence in the fitness industry with yoga, dance, aerobics and CrossFit.

Following a successful re-release of many of its sneaker and apparel lines from the early/mid 1990s, in November 2019, Reebok announced that it was updating the 1992 vector logo along with the original "Reebok" script in Motter Tektura typeface and restoring both as the company's core brand identity, citing that consumers still identified with them rather than the red delta logo, although the delta would continue to be used on some fitness lines.

Authentic Brands Group ownership
In July 2021, Adidas shortlisted bidders for the brand, the finalist companies being Wolverine World Wide and Authentic Brands Group on a joint deal, private equity companies Advent International, CVC, Cerberus Capital, and Sycamore Partners, with a deadline for August 2021. On August 12, 2021, it was announced that Authentic Brands Group would be acquiring the Reebok brand from Adidas for at least $2.5 billion. On March 1, 2022, the acquisition was finalized.

Logo evolution

Offices
Reebok's global headquarters are located in Boston, Massachusetts, in the Seaport District. In EMEA countries, Authentic Brands Group is working with Bounty Apparel in South Africa, Al Boom Marine in the Middle East and North Africa, and Flo Magazacilik in Turkey to grow the business.

Products

Reebok designs, manufactures, distributes and sells fitness, running and CrossFit sportswear including clothing and accessories. The company has released numerous notable styles of footwear including the 1982 introduction of the Reebok Freestyle that was manufactured and marketed for women. In 1984, the shoe accounted for more than half of Reebok's sales, and the company subsequently released similar styles including the Princess, Empress and Dutchess lines. Following the aerobics trend from the 1980s to early 1990s, Reebok also released workout programs called Reebok Step beginning in 1989. The brand also introduced one of their signature shoes, the Reebok Pump. The footwear collection was released as a men's basketball shoe and the world's first fully adjustable fit controlled with manual air allocation.

The Reebok Ventilator, a line of lightweight athletic shoes with vented side panels, was first introduced in 1990. In 1996, Reebok signed a $50 million endorsement deal with Allen Iverson when he signed with the Philadelphia 76ers. Iverson collaborated with Reebok during his contract to create the second-longest running basketball shoe line in history, beginning with the Question shoe in 1996 and ending with Answer XIV.

In 2010, the brand released Reebok Zig, an athletic footwear technology and collection of shoes featuring zigzag foam soles designed to push athletes forward. The Reebok Nano was released in 2011 as the first official CrossFit shoe. The company has also partnered with Les Mills and CrossFit to produce more fitness apparel, footwear, and workouts. Reebok debuted the Z-Series foam, a combination of dense midsole and outsole foam that is cushioned but durable, in 2014 on the ZQuick TR with Reebok's new delta logo.

Reebok Future innovation house has developed a new technology they call Liquid Factory. A robot will extrude liquid polyurethane and "draw" shoe components without the use of traditional shoe molds.

In 2017, the UFC announced the launch of a new line under the name Fight Night Collection that includes an upgraded version of the Reebok-branded apparels.

Endorsements

Asia
Reebok sponsored kits for top seeded Indian Football clubs, Mohun Bagan AC (2006–11) and East Bengal FC (2003–05, 2006–10). Later it sponsored kits for Indian Premier League teams, such as the Royal Challengers Bangalore, Kolkata Knight Riders, Rajasthan Royals and Chennai Super Kings in the first edition of the league held in 2008. However, for the second edition held in 2009, the sponsorships included Royal Challengers Bangalore, Kolkata Knight Riders, Chennai Super Kings, Kings XI Punjab kits.

On the charge of alleged Foreign Exchange Management Act (FEMA) violations, Reebok India was booked and may face penal action. Twelve further arrests of employees and associates were made during the same period. As of July 2013, Prem and Bhagat were granted bail by the high court but remained imprisoned following their detainment in September 2012.

One of Reebok's most prominent athletes, Indian cricketer Mahendra Singh Dhoni, was named by Forbes as the world's thirty first highest-paid sportsperson in June 2012. At the time of the article, Dhoni endorsed more than 20 other brands in deals that were cumulatively valued at US$23 million.

Europe

The company maintained its relationship with its origins in the UK through a long-term sponsorship deal with Bolton Wanderers, a League One football club, however, in 2009, Bolton changed their sponsorship to 188bet. When the team moved to a brand new ground in the late-1990s, their new home was named the Reebok Stadium.

Several other English clubs, such as Liverpool F.C., had Reebok sponsorship deals up until the purchase by Adidas, but most have since switched to either the parent brand (which has a long history in football) or another company altogether. In April 2014, Bolton Wanderers officially announced the Reebok Stadium would be officially rebranded in a new sponsorship deal with sportswear manufacturer Macron, who will manufacture the club's kits and sponsor the stadium under the name Macron Stadium in a four-year deal announced by the club's chairman, Phil Gartside. In Germany, Reebok sponsored football club 1. FC Köln.

In rugby union, Reebok sponsored the Wales national team until late 2008, who won the Grand Slam in the Six Nations Championship in that year, and the Tasman Makos in New Zealand's domestic competition, the Air New Zealand Cup.

In 2006, Arsenal and France national team striker Thierry Henry signed a deal to join the "I Am What I Am" campaign on August 1, 2006. Manchester United winger Ryan Giggs has also done "I Am What I Am" commercials. Andriy Shevchenko started his endorsement deal with the company in 2006.

Russia
In February 2019, the Russian Instagram version of a global Reebok advertising campaign to promote female empowerment under the hashtag #BeMoreHuman featured the slogan "Sit not on the needle of men’s approval – sit on men’s face." After facing outrage on social media, Reebok removed the slogan and their Russian marketing director resigned.

On March 21, 2022, Reebok suspended all branded stores and e-commerce operations in Russia after Russia's invasion of Ukraine.

North America

In 2004, Reebok entered into a deal that allows them the rights to manufacture Canadian Football League (CFL) onfield jerseys, sideline gear and footwear; this deal ended in 2015.

In Mexico, Reebok was kit provider of Chivas de Guadalajara before the team was taken over by parent company Adidas in 2011.

United States 
Reebok shoes were featured as product placement advertising on the Nickelodeon game show Double Dare in the 1980s.

Reebok signed Venus Williams after she won singles titles at Wimbledon and the 2000 Summer Olympics. From 2002 to 2012, the company held the exclusive rights to manufacture and market both authentic and replica uniform jerseys, sideline clothing and caps, and onfield football footwear (marketed as NFL Equipment) of the teams of the National Football League (NFL). It hired filmmaker Errol Morris to produce a series of 30-second commercials that aired during the 2006 NFL season.

In 2004, Reebok signed a four-year deal as the official shoe supplier to Major League Baseball (MLB). It became the exclusive apparel outfitter for the 29 teams in the NBA, and 16 WNBA teams for ten years beginning in the 2004–2005 season. The deal also added the Reebok vector logo to the 2004 U.S. Olympic basketball team's uniforms.

Reebok held the rights to produce the on-ice Edge Uniform System, performance clothing and training footwear of the National Hockey League (NHL) in a 10-year agreement from 2007 to 2017.

On December 2, 2014, the Ultimate Fighting Championship (UFC) announced a six-year deal with Reebok, which began in July 2015.

In July 2018, Reebok Boston Track Club announced to be led by coach Chris Fox from Syracuse University.

Oceania 
In 2005, Reebok also signed an exclusive agreement to design and supply all eight team home and away strips for the new Australian A-League competition. Although not an expensive deal, this partnership paid dividends for Reebok, due to the growing popularity of football and the league in the area. An estimated 125,000 A-League jerseys were sold in Australia, a record for a single league's sales in a year for a sports manufacturer. Reebok's agreement ended at the finish of the 2010–11 season. On 29 September 2022, they announced a partnership with the National Basketball League (NBL) as the official footwear partner for the 2022–23 season.

South America 
Reebok was the uniform provider for Brazilian clubs Cruzeiro, Vasco, Internacional and São Paulo FC; Argentinian club San Martín de Los Andes; Paraguayan club General Díaz and Uruguayan club Peñarol. In November 2022, the company announced its return to the football stage, signing a new deal with Botafogo.

Non-sport related endorsements 
Rapper Jay-Z became the first non-athlete to get a signature shoe from Reebok. The "S. Carter Collection by Rbk" was launched on November 21, 2002, and the S. Carter sneaker became the fastest-selling shoe in the company's history. Later, Reebok made a deal with rapper 50 Cent to release a line of G-Unit sneakers, and artists such as Nelly and Miri Ben-Ari have become spokespersons for the company. Reebok also signed Scarlett Johansson and introduced her own line of clothing and footwear called Scarlett Hearts, part of the Rbk Lifestyle Collection. The company also produces shoes for Emporio Armani under the label EA7. Artists and fashion figures that have signed endorsement agreements with Reebok over the years include Ariana Grande, Gal Gadot, Gigi Hadid, Victoria Beckham, Cardi B, and Camille Kostek.

Charitable work
The Reebok Foundation operates the "Build Our Kids' Success" (BOKS) program to provide US schoolchildren with physical activities before the school day. Reebok funds the program with direct grants and by contributing a percentage of shoe sales.

See also
 Reebok advertising campaigns
 Reebok Pro Summer League

Notes

References

External links

 

 
American brands
Athletic shoe brands
Authentic Brands Group
Clothing companies established in 1958
Clothing companies of the United States
Companies based in Boston
Companies formerly listed on the New York Stock Exchange
Ice hockey brands
Shoe companies of the United States
Sporting goods manufacturers of the United States
Sportswear brands
Swimwear manufacturers
1980s fashion
1990s fashion
1985 mergers and acquisitions
2005 mergers and acquisitions
2022 mergers and acquisitions